The men's 100 metre backstroke event at the 1968 Olympic Games took place between 21 and 22 October. This swimming event used backstroke.  Because an Olympic-size swimming pool is 50 metres long, this race consisted of two lengths of the pool.

Medalists

Results

Heats
Heat 1

Heat 2

Heat 3

Heat 4

Heat 5

Heat 6

Semifinals
Heat 1

Heat 2

Final

Key: OR = Olympic record

References

Men's backstroke 100 metre
Men's events at the 1968 Summer Olympics